Møllehøj is the highest natural point  in Denmark at .

Geography 

Møllehøj is in the Ejerbjerge hills in Skanderborg municipality, very close to Ejer Bavnehøj. The summit is marked with a millstone,  a remnant of Ejer mill which was situated on the hill from 1838 to 1917. The mill had eight sides and had an onion-shaped roof.

New measurements made in February 2005 showed that Møllehøj was higher than both Yding Skovhøj (172.66 m including a Bronze Age burial mound on its summit, 170.77 m without) in Horsens municipality and Ejer Bavnehøj, which had both been thought higher. These two high points' natural heights are, however, respectively 9 and 51 cm lower than Møllehøj. It was officially recognised as Denmark's highest point in 2005.

See also
 Himmelbjerget, which was thought to be the highest point of Denmark until 1847

Notes

References

Highest points of countries
Hills of Denmark
Skanderborg Municipality